Bacalhau à Zé do Pipo (literally Bacalhau à la Zé do Pipo) is a common codfish (bacalhau) dish in Portugal. It is an oven baked dish, consisting in layers of bacalhau (previously boiled in milk), onion (or pickles), mashed potatoes with a hint of ground nutmeg, and mayonnaise. Although mayonnaise is not traditionally used in Portuguese cuisine, in this dish it's considered typical. It is usually garnished with olives and/or peppers. The recipe originates from Porto, having achieved popularity in Vizela, being named after its creator, Zé do Pipo, who owned a famous restaurant in that city during the 1960s. He won a national gastronomic contest with this main course, making many restaurants adopt it in their menus and popularizing it through the country to this day.

See also
 List of casserole dishes

References

Fish dishes
Portuguese cuisine
Casserole dishes
Culture in Porto
Potato dishes